Tryškiai is a small town in Telšiai district municipality, Lithuania with a population of about 1,000.

History
In late July 1941, 70 to 80 Jewish men were killed in a mass execution perpetrated by an Einsatzgruppen of Germans and Lithuanian nationalists.
Two weeks later the Jewish women and children of the town were sent to the Žagarė ghetto where they were murdered during the ghetto liquidation.

Further reading
 Ita Hersch, "My Childhood in Trishik." 
 Jews in Trishik

References

Shtetls
Towns in Lithuania
Towns in Telšiai County
Shavelsky Uyezd
Holocaust locations in Lithuania